Werner Scholz (born 1 December 1944) is a retired German football goalkeeper.

References

External links 
 

1944 births
Living people
Footballers from Duisburg
German footballers
Association football goalkeepers
Bundesliga players
2. Bundesliga players
Alemannia Aachen players
VfL Bochum players
VfL Bochum II players
Rot-Weiss Essen players
West German footballers